Replacing Dad is a 1999 American television film directed by Joyce Chopra. Based on a Shelley Fraser Mickle novel, the film stars Mary McDonnell, William Russ, Jack Coleman and (a then-unknown) Shailene Woodley in her film debut.

Plot 
Linda Marsh (Mary McDonnell) is a housewife who seems to have a perfect life: along with her husband, high school principal George (William Russ) and three loving children Drew (Erik von Detten), Mandy (Camilla Belle) and Willie (Hayden Tank), she is living in a suburban house in a small and peaceful town. One day, she decides to surprise her husband at his office to celebrate their 16th anniversary, and finds him kissing with one of the teachers, Ann Marie Scott (Michele Abrams). Immediately, her life falls apart, and she lands in a roller coaster of emotions.

Her husband initially tries to save their marriage, but Linda kicks him out of the house. They later fight over the raising of the children. To forget her depression, Linda starts going out in bars, for which George condemns her. He blames her of bad parenting, while she continues to blame the adultery for everything that is going wrong in the family. Mandy refuses to speak to her father, and Drew is especially mad at George, because he has always felt unwanted by him. Willie, on the other hand, misses his father enormously and starts acting out by constantly wearing a bunny suit.

One day, Linda allows Drew to drive her car, and he accidentally causes a minor car accident with Dr. Mark Chandler (Jack Coleman). Sometime later, she meets him again at his office, where her son Drew has an appointment. Chandler discovers that he has dyslexia, which hurts Drew's self-confidence, as he was already struggling with his relationship with George. Mark becomes close to the family, and Linda's mother Dixie (Tippi Hedren) - who came to town to support her daughter - convinces her daughter to start dating him.

Meanwhile, George finds out that his new life with Ann Marie is not all that satisfying as expected, and he meets with Linda to convince her to try and save their marriage. Linda almost falls for him again, until he makes a nasty remark. She makes a scene and tells him that she can't believe that she was ever in love with him. Soon after, Ann Marie, annoyed by George's pessimistic behavior, breaks off their relationship. George lands into a severe depression, and one day calls Linda and his children announcing his suicide. Linda and the children rush to the motel where he is staying, and convince him not to shoot himself.

Cast

References

External links

1999 television films
1999 films
1999 drama films
Adultery in films
American drama television films
Films about families
Films based on American novels
Films directed by Joyce Chopra
Films scored by Lee Holdridge
1990s English-language films
1990s American films